Anne-Sophie Le Paranthoën (born 24 February 1977 in Tokyo, Japan) is an international-level swimmer from France. At the 2007 World Championships she set a French Record in the 100m Breaststroke (1:08.68).

As of July 2009, she still holds the French Record in the short-course 50 breaststroke (31.49).

References

1977 births
Living people
French female breaststroke swimmers
European Aquatics Championships medalists in swimming

Mediterranean Games gold medalists for France
Swimmers at the 2005 Mediterranean Games
Mediterranean Games medalists in swimming